The 1991 anti-Tamil violence in Karnataka refers to incidents of mob violence targeting Tamils in state of Karnataka in India. The incidents took place in Southern Karnataka on 12–13 December 1991, mainly in the cities of Bangalore and Mysore. The attacks originated in the demonstrations organised against the orders of the Cauvery Water Tribunal appointed by the Government of India. The violence terrified the Tamil populace of Southern Karnataka forcing hundreds of thousands to flee in a matter of weeks. The official statistics given by the Government of Karnataka was that sixteen people had been killed in the police firing during protest but individual sources give higher numbers.

Background 

As of 2001, Tamil-speakers formed 3.82% of the total population of Karnataka. Minority Tamil-speaking people are found in the districts of Bangalore Urban, Bangalore Rural, Ramanagara, Mysore, Kolar, Hassan, few in Mandya and Chamarajanagar in southern Karnataka, and few in Shimoga in central Karnataka

While the Bangalore Cantonment area administered directly by the Government of British India prior to its integration with the then Mysore state, had a sizable Tamil-speaking populations. The migrants occupied extremely diverse positions in the socioeconomic strata and represented every class, caste and community in Tamil Nadu. Gradually, this demographic and bureaucratic domination began to be resented by Kannada people who felt that the immigrant Tamils were snatching away their rightful jobs.

Events 

On 25 June 1991, the Kaveri Water Tribunal, constituted in 1990, directed the Karnataka state government to release 205 billion ft3 (5.8 km3) of water to Tamil Nadu within a year. Karnataka issued an ordinance to annul the tribunal's award but this was struck down by the Supreme Court of India. The tribunal's award was subsequently gazetted by the Government of India on 11 December 1991.

The very next day, pro-Kannada organisations led by Vatal Nagaraj called for a bandh on 13 December alleging partisan behaviour of the Government of India. Their leaders declared

  
The next day, marauding mobs roamed the streets of Bangalore. Tamil businesses, movie theatres and even vehicles with Tamil Nadu license plates were targeted. Soon the riots spread to the Mysore district and other parts of southern Karnataka and Tamil Nadu. Entire slums of migrants were torched. Over thousands of Tamils fled from the state. A curfew of one week was declared under section 144. The violence left more than 16 people dead in Bangalore city.

The Indian Peoples' Human Rights Tribunal puts the total property losses suffered in Tamil Nadu and Karnataka at  170 million while the Venkatesh Commission has given estimates varying from  30 million to  155 million.

Aftermath 

The situation was soon brought under control and though, there were incidents of violence reported till the end of 1991, the situation had calmed down.

There have been similar incidents of violence in 1996, 2000, 2004 and 2016.

See also
 List of riots in India

Notes

References 

 
 

Anti-Tamil Riots of Karnataka, 1991
Anti-Tamil Riots of Karnataka, 1991
1990s in Bangalore
History of Karnataka (1947–present)
Riots and civil disorder in India
Regionalism in India
Crime in Karnataka
Violence against indigenous peoples